Linea Palmisano is an American businesswoman, non-profit executive, and politician serving as a member of the Minneapolis City Council for the 13th ward, and as the council's Vice-President.

Education
Palmisano earned a Bachelor of Science degree from the University of Notre Dame and a Master of Business Administration from the University of Minnesota, where she specialized in strategy and entrepreneurship.

Career
Palmisano has worked as the board chair of the Linden Hills Neighborhood Council and founder of the NAVIGATE immigrant college access program. She also worked as a track coach at Southwest High School. She also served as an intermediary between neighborhood association and the office of Mayor Betsy Hodges. Palmisano was elected to the Minneapolis City Council in November 2013 and took office on January 2, 2014, succeeding Hodges. While city council seats are officially nonpartisan, Palmisano is affiliated with the Minnesota Democratic–Farmer–Labor Party.

After the murder of George Floyd and resulting protests, Palmisano was one of three council members who did not sign a formal pledge to defund the police department. In a letter, Palmisano announced her support for a human rights lawsuit against the Minneapolis Police Department, and advocated for "transformative change" of the department and its practices.

On January 10, 2022, Palmisano was elected as Vice-President of the Minneapolis City Council in an 8-5 vote.

Personal life
Palmisano lives with her husband and two sons in Linden Hills, Minneapolis.

See also

 George Floyd protests in Minneapolis–Saint Paul
 2021 Minneapolis Question 2

References

Living people
Minneapolis City Council members
University of Notre Dame alumni
Carlson School of Management alumni
Women city councillors in Minnesota
21st-century American politicians
21st-century American women politicians
1976 births